Coatesville station is an Amtrak intercity rail station located in Coatesville, Pennsylvania.  It is served by most Amtrak Keystone Service trains. The station has two side platforms serving the outer tracks of the three-track Philadelphia to Harrisburg Main Line.

History
Coatesville station opened in the 1830s on the Philadelphia and Columbia Railroad, which later became part of the Main Line of the Pennsylvania Railroad (PRR). The railroad built a two-story Italianate brick depot, now disused, in 1868. Amtrak took over Philadelphia–Harrisburg Silverliner Service (now Keystone Service) from PRR successor Penn Central in 1972. The SEPTA Regional Rail Parkesburg Line served Coatesville from 1990 to 1996, when service was cut back to Downingtown during budget cuts.

Reconstruction
In summer 2013, the Chester County Economic Development Council announced the selection of a developer for a project to revitalize the Coatesville station area. Total costs will be dependent on final design and engineering estimates, but the Pennsylvania Department of Transportation (PennDOT) has pledged approximately $20 million to the project. Under the plan, a new station with parking would be built just east of the historic depot, along the tracks between Third and Fourth Avenues.

SEPTA indicated in March 2019 that Regional Rail service would be extended from Thorndale to Coatesville "in the near future." The $21 million project was put out to bid in July 2021, with construction planned to last from late 2021 to 2025. A $1.65 million parking garage will also be built. A groundbreaking ceremony was held on October 22, 2021, with Governor Tom Wolf in attendance.

References

External links 

PennDOT – Coatesville Station Project

Amtrak stations in Pennsylvania
Railway stations in Chester County, Pennsylvania
Former Pennsylvania Railroad stations
Coatesville, Pennsylvania
Former SEPTA Regional Rail stations
Philadelphia to Harrisburg Main Line
Railway stations in the United States opened in 1868